The 1945–46 Tercera División was the 10th edition of the Spanish third national tier. The competition was divided into 3 phases.

Format 

The division comprised 100 clubs in 10 geographic groups. The top 3 clubs in each group (30 in total) progressed to the Second Phase. The Second Phase comprised 5 groups of 6 clubs, each club playing 10 matches. The 5 group winners progressed to the Final Phase - a group of 5 clubs, each playing 8 matches.  The top two teams were promoted to the Segunda División and the third-placed team played off against the 12th placed team in the Segunda División.

Regular season

Group 1

Group 2

Group 3

Group 4

Group 5

Group 6

Group 7

Group 8

Group 9

Group 10

Group 10 repechage

 
Replay:

Calavera was withdraw of this group before the start the competition.
Between Cadiz and Tetuán was played a match to play on this group, Cádiz promoted.

Second phase

Group 1

Group 2

Group 3

Group 4

Group 5

Final phase

Group

Promotion/relegation playoff

Note: Baracaldo were promoted to the Segunda División.

External links
www.rsssf.com
Research by Asociación para la Recopilación de Estadísticas del Fútbol (AREFE)

Tercera División seasons
3
Spain